Vs Art is the first album by the DC3. Officially, it is considered a Damian Cowell solo album, but all three of the DC3 worked on it.

The album is only available as a free CD with the Museum of Old and New Art book Monanisms. Some of the songs on the album date back to 2008 and were performed by Cowell's former band Root!.

Track List

External links 
 Vs Art at Discogs

2010 albums